Jameson High School, located in Kadoma, Zimbabwe, offers education from Form 1 up to A-Level .

Jameson High School was named after Sir Leander Starr Jameson, a doctor and an administrator of the former Rhodesia, now Zimbabwe. Jameson is an co-ed, interracial school which offers sports such as rugby, cricket, tennis, basketball, swimming, field hockey, netball and volleyball.

There are four hostels, Warne House (boys - the Bulldogs), Starr House, (boys - the Mighty Men), Leander Hostel and Hoult House (girls- the bunnies). Around 700 students enroll at the school yearly and 200 live in boarding. The school motto is 'Sine Metu' (Latin for 'without fear') and the school mascot is a Panda bear.

Jameson School Song 
'Sine Metu'

Eyes alight and ready with a helping hand

Minds open out and reaching for the blue

In Zimbabwe, we can build a joyous land 

Sine Metu.

Grateful always for the rain and for the sun

We'll make the most of chances, though they may be few

This can be a pleasant place for everyone

Sine Metu.

Onward, upward, facing all with confidence

Scorning the false and fighting for the truth

Meeting problems and changing them to stepping stones

Sine Metu

High schools in Zimbabwe
Kadoma District
Boarding schools in Zimbabwe
Buildings and structures in Mashonaland West Province
Education in Mashonaland West Province